"Fragile Tension"/"Hole to Feed" are two songs by Depeche Mode. They were released as the third single from the group's 2009 studio album Sounds of the Universe, their 48th UK single overall, and their third double A-side single, following "Blasphemous Rumours / Somebody" and "John the Revelator / Lilian". "Hole to Feed" is the second Depeche Mode single written by Dave Gahan along with co-writers Christian Eigner and Andrew Phillpott, succeeding the first being "Suffer Well", from their previous album Playing the Angel. Gahan told The Guardian that "Hole to Feed" is, "a very cynical song about wanting to fill a gaping hole but not knowing what to fill it with. About sometimes the idea of having a hole to feed all being a figment of my imagination when I'm actually fine."
It was announced on their website on 7 November 2009 and was released on 7 December 2009. Unlike the other two singles from the album, there are no plans to release a 7" vinyl edition at this time, and there will not be a limited edition CD ("LCD") either. It was not released in the US, nor was it released anywhere else.

Both songs have been slightly edited and remixed for the single. "Fragile Tension" has some new instrumentation and clearer vocals, while "Hole to Feed" has been rearranged and some sections have been removed.

On the band's Tour of the Universe, "Hole to Feed" was played at every show as the 3rd song, always after "Wrong". "Fragile Tension" was performed only once, at a show in Toronto.

Music videos
The video for "Hole to Feed" debuted in August 2009 and was directed by Eric Wareheim (of Tim and Eric Awesome Show, Great Job!). The video, which does not feature the band at all, received negative feedback from fans on YouTube.  It stars Cheyenne Haynes as the lead singer. The "Fragile Tension" video was directed by Rob Chandler and Barney Steel.

Track listing

12": Mute / 12BONG 42
Released: December 21, 2009

CD: Mute / CDBONG 42

Digital download: Mute / iBONG 42

iTunes download: Mute / LiBONG 42

Charts

References

External links
 Single information from the official Depeche Mode web site
 Allmusic review

2009 singles
Depeche Mode songs
Songs written by Martin Gore
Mute Records singles
Song recordings produced by Ben Hillier